Yarrobil National Park is located in New South Wales, Australia.

It was previously a State forest and was converted to a national park in December 2005.

It is located at an altitude of 546 meters.

References

External links 
  NSW Environment Department website

National parks of New South Wales
Protected areas established in 2005